Großlobming is a municipality in the district of Murtal in Styria, Austria. It is located on the banks of the river Mur.

References

Cities and towns in Murtal District